Shannon Dion Penn (born September 11, 1969) is a former designated hitter in Major League Baseball. He played for the Detroit Tigers.

References

External links

1969 births
Living people
Major League Baseball designated hitters
Detroit Tigers players
Baseball players from Cincinnati
Butte Copper Kings players
Gastonia Rangers players
Gulf Coast Rangers players
London Tigers players
Niagara Falls Rapids players
Toledo Mud Hens players
African-American baseball players
Lakeland Lakers baseball players
21st-century African-American people
20th-century African-American sportspeople